Kopiko may refer to:

 Kopiko (confectionery), a brand of coffee confectioneries produced in Southeast Asia
 Kopiko, common name for Psychotria mariniana tree, a species of the family Rubiaceae endemic to Hawaii